Esmail Koushan or Kooshan (1917–1981) was an Iranian film director who was one of the pioneering figures of Persian cinema. He has been called "the father of the Iranian film industry" by Georges Sadoul.

Koushan, who studied film-making in Germany at Universum Film Aktienge-Sellschafe (UFA), began by dubbing foreign-language films into Parsi. He then set up the Mitrafilm company, which produced the first Iranian "talkie" feature film in 1948, The Storm of Life.

Filmography 
The Storm of Life (1948) - producer
 Pretty Foe (1962)

See also
Iranian cinema

References

Iranian film directors
Persian-language film directors
1917 births
1981 deaths